The Church of St Andrew, Penrice, Swansea, Wales dates from the 12th century. A Grade II* listed building, St Andrew's remains an active parish church in the parish of South-West Gower, in the Diocese of Swansea and Brecon.

History and description
The church is dedicated to St Andrew, and was begun in the early 12th century. Later in that century, it was gifted by the de Penrice family, who had gained lands in Gower during the Norman invasion of Wales, to the Order of Knights Hospitaller at Slebech. In the 19th century the church was restored by Elizabeth Talbot of Penrice Castle. The church remains an active parish church in the Diocese of Swansea and Brecon.

The church is "large by Gower standards", and is constructed in a mix of local Red sandstone and limestone. Cruciform in plan, it comprises a tower, nave, chancel and two transepts. John Newman, in his Glamorgan volume of the Buildings of Wales Pevsner, describes these as the church's "most remarkable feature", noting their considerable width and depth. The porch transept was used for the conduct of parish business in the medieval period, and subsequently as a schoolroom. The church is a Grade II* listed building, its Cadw listing record describing it as "a conservatively restored medieval church of interesting form".

In the churchyard stands the grave of Captain Sir Christopher Cole RN KCB, who married into the Talbot family. His monument is an early example of Celtic Revival sculpture, dating from 1836.

Notes

References

Sources
 

12th-century church buildings in Wales
Grade II* listed churches in Swansea
Grade II* listed buildings in Swansea